Euchromius keredjella is a moth in the family Crambidae. It was described by Hans Georg Amsel in 1949. It is found in Iran, Afghanistan and Turkey.

References

Crambinae
Moths described in 1949
Moths of Africa
Moths of Asia